Milton Francis (18 May 1932 – 30 June 2009) was an Australian rower. He competed in the men's eight event at the 1960 Summer Olympics.

References

1932 births
2009 deaths
Australian male rowers
Olympic rowers of Australia
Rowers at the 1960 Summer Olympics
Rowers from Western Australia
20th-century Australian people